El Otro Lado De Mi is the fifth and final studio album by Colombian-American singer-songwriter Soraya, released on March 1, 2005 by EMI Latin. The album was also nominated for a Latin Grammy for "Best Latin Pop Female Album" in 2005.

Track listing

References

2005 albums
Soraya (musician) albums